Pomps is a commune in the Pyrénées-Atlantiques département in south-western France. An individual from Pomps is known as Pompsois.

Geography
Pomps is located in the northeast of the département, and lies about 20 kilometers to the north of the cities of Béarn and Pau.

Transportation
Pomps is served by county roads (French: "routes départmentales") 945 and 946.

Neighboring Communities
 Morlanne to the north
 Hagetaubin to the northwest
 Géus-d'Arzacq and Bouillon to the east
 Arthez-de-Béarn to the east
 Arnos to the south east
 Castillon (Canton d'Arthez-de-Béarn) to the southwest
 Doazon to the south

History

The name of the commune of Pomps has appeared throughout time as Poms in the 14th century, and later, in the year 1443, as Pombs.

Administration

Demographics

For statistical purposes, Pomps is considered a part of the functional urban area (aire d'attraction des villes) of Pau.

See also
Communes of the Pyrénées-Atlantiques department

References

Communes of Pyrénées-Atlantiques